Women's Entrepreneurship Day (WED) is a day on which the work of women entrepreneurs is observed and discussed, held every day of each year. The inaugural event was held in New York City at the United Nations, with additional events being held simultaneously in several other countries. 144 nations overall recognized the first WED in 2014, which included the presentation of the Women's Entrepreneurship Day Pioneer Awards. The organization behind WED also has an ambassadorship and fellowship program.

History
Women's Entrepreneurship Day was founded and implemented by Pet Pioneer, Animal Fair Media Founder and Ellis Island Medal of Honor recipient Wendy Diamond, after volunteering with the Adelante Foundation who provides microcredit to low income women while in Honduras. Upon her return to the US she decided she wanted to develop something to help this and similar philanthropic causes. The first day was held on November 19, 2014, and was observed in 144 countries that year. It was described by Fortune Magazine as “a global movement to celebrate and support female founders and shed light on some of their challenges.” Forbes Magazine wrote that the intention was also “to mobilize a global network of female business owners, entrepreneurs, and change-makers who support and empower this community of women entrepreneurs and their businesses.” November 19 was proclaimed an “official day” by both New York Governor Andrew Cuomo and New York City Mayor Bill de Blasio, Philadelphia Mayor Jim Kenney, and Los Angeles Mayor Eric Garcetti and is celebrated annually at the United Nations and around the globe. The U.S. House of Representatives also annually recognizes the WEDO movement November 19 as “A Day in Honor of Women Entrepreneurs” under the leadership of Congresswoman Grace Meng.

Inaugural event at the United Nations
Women's Entrepreneurship Day event convenes at the United Nations in New York City including a conference, speakers, and the inaugural Women's Entrepreneurship Day Pioneer Awards. An Education Philanthropy Pioneer Award was given to Barack Obama’s grandmother Sarah Obama, for her work in bringing gender equality to education in that country. Obama was presented the award by actress Quvenzhané Wallis. Loreen Arbus received an award for her philanthropic work, as did to Lynn Tilton.

Other attendees of the United Nations inaugural launch included actress Rose Byrne; Miss Universe Gabriela Isler; Jimmy Choo co-founder Tamara Mellon; and First Ladies Gertrude Maseko of Malawi and Penehupifo Pohamba of Namibia. Delegations were sent from many different nations attended the event as well. A second WED is planned at the United Nations in 2015: the United Nations Foundation is a founding partner of the events.

List of Pioneer Award winners

2014

 Loreen Arbus  (Philanthropy) – President of Loreen Arbus Productions
 Lynn Tilton (Business) – Founder and CEO of  Patriarch Partners 
 Mama Sarah Obama (Education) – Founder and CEO of The Mama Sarah Obama Foundation 
 Sandy Lerner (Technology) – Co-founder of Cisco Systems and Founder of Urban Decay
 Shannon Schuyler (Social Responsibility) – Chief Corporate Responsibility and Purpose Officer of PricewaterhouseCoopers, LLP (PwC US), and President of the PwC Charitable Foundation, Inc.
 Tamara Mellon (Fashion) – Co-founder of Jimmy Choo and Creative Director & Founder of the Tamara Mellon brand

2015
 Dr. Jen Welter (Sports) – First woman to hold a coaching position in the NFL and linebacker for women's American football for 14 years 
 Heidi Messer (Technology) – chairwoman and co-founder of Collective[i] and Founder of LinkShare
 Kelly O. Chezum (Education) – President of External Relations at Clarkson University
 Leona Lewis (Music) – British singer-songwriter and Animal Welfare campaigner 
 Leslie Blodgett (Beauty) – Creator of bareMinerals, former CEO of Bare Escentuals, Board Member for Every Mother Counts, Stella & Dot, and SPANX
 Martha "Muffy" MacMillan (Philanthropy) – Ellis Island Medal of Honor Recipient, Director on the board of Cargill, Inc., Director of the Cargill Foundation, Waycrosse, Inc., Boards of the American Federation of Arts, Global Minnesota, The Economic Club of Minnesota, and Walker Art Center, Chair of Opportunity International's agricultural-finance campaign

2016
 Iris Apfel (Fashion) – interior designer and businesswoman 
 Joan Hornig (Accessories) –  American jewelry designer and the founder of Joan Hornig Jewelry and Ellis Island Medal of Honor Winner 
 Katia Beauchamp (Beauty) – CEO and co-founder of Birchbox
 Kay Koplovitz (Finance) – Founder of USA Network and Syfy and the first woman to serve as network president in television history 
 Mindy Grossman (Philanthropy) – CEO of WeightWatchers and CEO and director of HSN and a member of the company's Board of Directors 
 Sandra Lee (Celebrity) – television chef and author 
 Tao Porchon-Lynch (Sports) – Yoga master and author
 Yue-Sai Kan (Business) – television host and producer, entrepreneur, author and humanitarian

2017
 Andrea Kerzner (Arts) – Daughter of Sol Kerzner, Founder and CEO of Lalela Project, Co-Creator of themoreweshare.com, Director of the Board of Kerzner International Holdings Limited 
 Angie Bastian (Culinary) – Founder, Angie's Boomchickapop 
 Bobbi Brown (Beauty) – CEO of Beauty Evolution and Former CEO & Chief Creative Officer of Bobbi Brown Cosmetics
 Dorothy "Dottie" Herman (Business) – Co-founder, President & CEO of Real Estate brokerage firm Douglas Elliman Real Estate, LLC
 Judith Ripka (Accessories) – Luxury Jewelry Designer & Founder of Judith Ripka 
 Lucy Jarvis (Media) – First woman television producer, Peabody Award winner
 Muna Rihani Al-Nasser (Philanthropy) – Chairwoman of the UN Women for Peace Association 
 Sara Bareilles (Music) – Singer-Songwriter Waitress Writer/Composer 
 Sonia Gardner (Finance) – President, Managing Partner, and co-founder of Avenue Capital Group & Global Chair of the Board of 100 Women in Finance 
 Suzanne Lerner (Fashion) – President and co-founder of Michael Stars and Board Member of Women Thrive Alliance 
 Twinkle Khanna (Celebrity) – actress, entrepreneur, author, and philanthropist

2018 
 Anna Sui (Fashion) – Fashion Designer and Entrepreneur 
 Eileen Murray (Finance) – CO-CEO Bridgewater Associates
 Her Highness Princess Märtha Louise of Norway (Politics) – Author & Chair Princess Märtha Louise's Fund to benefit disabled children
 Kathleen King (Culinary) –  Founder Tate's Bake Shop
 Mary Ann Thompson-Frenk (Civics) –  President/Co-founder Memnosyne Foundation & The John Philip Thompson Foundation
 Shannon Dellimore (Beauty) – Co-founder & Creative Director GLAMGLOW 
 Shari Staglin (Philanthropy) – CEO Staglin Family Vineyard, Co-founder One Mind 
 Shelley Zalis (Technology) – Founder OTX Global Technology Consulting Firm, CEO/Founder The Female Quotient

2019 
 Wendy Diamond (Humanitarian) – A Social Entrepreneur, Impact Investor, Humanitarian, Animal Advocate, Best-Selling Author and CEO/Founder of Women's Entrepreneurship Day Organization (WEDO)/#ChooseWOMEN, a non-governmental philanthropic volunteer organization. WED, with chapters in 144 countries and 112 universities/colleges, is on a global mission to alleviate poverty and empower women in business.
 Hannah Stocking (Influencer) – Global Entertainer 25+ Million Followers  
 Missy Elliott (Music) – Grammy Award Winning Musical Artist 
 Leah Solivan (Technology) – General Partner Fuel Capital & Founder TaskRabbit
 Stephanie Newby (Finance) – Founder Golden Seeds, the premiere early-stage investment firm for women-led companies  
 Patty Baker (Philanthropy) – Philanthropist, Broadway Producer, Founder Baker Scholars, Board Member Hunter College Foundation (Baker Theater Building), New York Public Theater , Naples Players, Baker Art Museum & Milwaukee Repertory Theater.
 Norma Kamali (Fashion) – International Fashion Designer, Founder/CEO [[Normalife, Founder/CEO Wellness CAFÉ & STOP OBJECTIFICATION CAMPAIGN  
 Francine LeFrak (Accessories) – Founder/Visionary Same Sky, Chair Harvard Kennedy School Women's Leadership Board & Founder LeFrak Productions.

International events
Additional events were held internationally, including one at the University of Luxembourg, which held a conference that featured speeches from women entrepreneurs as well as discussions between local entrepreneurs. The keynote address was provided by Deputy Chief Executive of the European Investment Fund Marjut Santoni. Other events were also held, for example, in Lagos, Nigeria. WED founded and launched the Women Wednesday social media event held on the Wednesday after Thanksgiving in 2014, to support women in business and related causes.

Fellowships
In addition to the annual events, WED founded and initiated a Global Ambassador Initiative, in order to develop WED communities on university campuses. It also runs the Women's Entrepreneurship Day Fellows Program, which is chaired by Kunal Sood.

References

External links
 Official website

Recurring events established in 2014
November observances
Entrepreneurship organizations